Christopher Nicholas (born 16 January 1981) is a Jamaican retired footballer.

References

External links
 

Living people
1981 births
Jamaican footballers
Jamaica international footballers
Association football forwards
Tivoli Gardens F.C. players
Portmore United F.C. players